Fifi Ekanem Ejindu is a Nigerian architect, businesswoman and philanthropist. Born in Ibadan, she is the great-granddaughter of King James Ekpo Bassey of Cobham Town in Calabar, Nigeria.

Biography 

Fifi is the great-granddaughter of James Ekpo Bassey, an Efik monarch of the colonial era whose seat was in Cobham Town, Calabar, Nigeria. King Bassey, her mother's grandfather, was crowned king of Cobham Town by representatives of Queen Victoria in 1893. As a result of this heritage, Princess Fifi uses the title of H.H. The Obonganwan King James socially.

The princess was born Offiong Ekanem Ejindu in Ibadan, the capital of Oyo State, Nigeria. She was also raised there.

Her father, Professor Sylvester Joseph Una, studied at the Trinity College in Dublin and Brown University in the United States. He was the first Minister of Health in the former eastern region of Nigeria, and a member of the National Parliament in the lead up to independence. He then pursued an academic career and became one of the first indigenous lecturers at the University of Ibadan.
Princess Fifi's mother, the Obonganwan Ekpa Una, was also educated in England.

Princess Fifi attended UNC Charlotte. She further studied Architecture at Pratt Institute, a private design college in Brooklyn, New York.    In 1983, she graduated from Pratt, becoming the first black African woman to be awarded a B.Arch. from the institute.
After graduating, Fifi took courses at the Massachusetts Institute of Technology before she went on to work at a private firm in New York City. Fifi then returned to Pratt Institute to get her Masters in Urban Planning after which she returned to Nigeria.

On her return to Nigeria, Ejindu started the Starcrest Group of companies.  The company started in 1995, and comprises Starcrest Investment Ltd., Starcrest Associates Ltd. and Starcrest Industries Ltd, all involved in real estate, oil and gas, and building construction.

In 2013, she was awarded the African Achievers African Arts and Fashion Lifetime Achievement award.

See also
 List of Nigerian architects

References 

Place of birth missing (living people)
Living people
Businesspeople from Ibadan
Queen's College, Lagos alumni
Pratt Institute alumni
Nigerian fashion businesspeople
Nigerian real estate businesspeople
Nigerian philanthropists
Nigerian socialites
Nigerian princesses
20th-century Nigerian businesspeople
21st-century Nigerian businesspeople
Nigerian expatriates in the United States
Massachusetts Institute of Technology alumni
Nigerian women company founders
Nigerian businesspeople in the oil industry
Nigerian women architects
People of Efik descent
20th-century Nigerian architects
21st-century Nigerian architects
20th-century Nigerian businesswomen
21st-century Nigerian businesswomen
1962 births